Karl Pedersen (born 1940), is a Danish chess player, Danish Chess Championship medalist (1967).

Biography
Karl Pedersen participated many times in the finals of Danish Chess Championships and won silver medal in 1967.

Karl Pedersen played for Denmark in the Chess Olympiad:
 In 1972, at second reserve board in the 20th Chess Olympiad in Skopje (+6, =6, -3).

Karl Pedersen played for Denmark in the European Team Chess Championship:
 In 1970, at fifth board in the 4th European Team Chess Championship in Kapfenberg (+2, =2, -3).

Karl Pedersen played for Denmark in the World Student Team Chess Championship:
 In 1967, at third board in the 14th World Student Team Chess Championship in Harrachov (+1, =5, -1).

Karl Pedersen played for Denmark in the Nordic Chess Cups:
 In 1971, at first board in the 2nd Nordic Chess Cup in Großenbrode (+1, =1, -3) and won team silver medal,
 In 1972, at first board in the 3rd Nordic Chess Cup in Großenbrode (+3, =0, -1) and won team silver medal.

References

External links

Karl Pedersen chess games at 365chess.com

1940 births
Living people
Danish chess players
Chess Olympiad competitors